Dany Jean (born 28 November 2002) is a Haitian professional footballer who plays as a winger for French  Ligue 1 team RC Strasbourg Alsace and the Haiti national team.

Club career
Orphaned at a young age, Jean is a youth product of the Haitian clubs Aigle Noir and Arcahaie, Jean moved to France signing a contract with Strasbourg on 21 July 2021. He began his senior career with their reserves, and made his first appearance on the senior bench in a Ligue 1 match against FC Nantes on 5 February 2022.

International career
Jean is a former youth international for Haiti, having represented the Haiti U17 at the 2019 FIFA U-17 World Cup. He debuted with the senior Haiti national team in a friendly 2–1 loss to Guatemala on 27 March 2022.

References

External links
 
 

2002 births
Living people
Sportspeople from Port-au-Prince
Association football wingers
Haitian footballers
Haiti youth international footballers
Haiti international footballers
Championnat National 3 players
Haitian expatriate footballers
Haitian expatriate sportspeople in France
Expatriate footballers in France